Mellon may refer to:

People 
 Mellon family, influential banking and political family originally of Pennsylvania, USA
 Rachel Mellon Walton (1899–2006)
 Richard Mellon Scaife (1932-2014), American publisher
 Richard B. Mellon (1858–1933), American banker, industrialist and philanthropist
 Richard King Mellon (1899–1970), American financier
 Sarah Mellon (1903–1965), heiress
 Thomas Mellon (1813–1908), Scots-Irish-American entrepreneur, lawyer, judge, founder of Mellon Bank, and patriarch of the Mellon family
 Ailsa Mellon Bruce (1901–1969), daughter of Andrew William Mellon, philanthropist
 Paul Mellon (1907–1999), son of Andrew William Mellon, philanthropist
 Andrew W. Mellon (1855–1937), U.S. banker, businessman and Treasury Secretary
 Christopher Mellon (born 1958), U.S. former politician and businessman
 William Larimer Mellon, Sr. (1868–1949), entrepreneur
 William Larimer Mellon, Jr. (1910–1989), a.k.a. Larry Mellon, philanthropist
 Timothy Mellon, entrepreneur, founder of Guilford Transportation Industries
 Alfred Mellon (1820 – 24 March 1867), British composer and conductor
 Micky Mellon (born 1972), Scottish former footballer, now Manager
 Niall Mellon (born 1967), Irish philanthropist
 Pauline Mellon, Irish mathematician

Other uses 
 Andrew W. Mellon Foundation,  private foundation with five core areas of interest, endowed with wealth accumulated by Andrew W. Mellon
 Mellon Trust, a charitable trust founded by Andrew W. Mellon
 Andrew W. Mellon Auditorium, a U.S. government-owned auditorium in Washington, D.C.'s Federal Triangle
 Carnegie Mellon University, leading university in Pittsburgh
 Mellon Institute, research institute founded by the Mellon family, merged to become Carnegie Mellon University
 Mellon College of Science, science college at Carnegie Mellon University
 Mellon Financial, a wholly owned subsidiary of The Bank of New York Mellon Corporation (BNY Mellon)
 Mellon Arena, home of the NHL Pittsburgh Penguins
 Mellon Square, Square located in Pittsburgh
 Mellon Collie and the Infinite Sadness, Smashing Pumpkin's 1995 2-disc album
 Mellon (meaning "friend") is the password to enter Moria in the novel The Lord of the Rings
 Mellon (newspaper), a Greek socialist newspaper
 Mellon: An American Life, a 2006 biography of Andrew Mellon by David Cannadine

See also 
 Saint Mellonius, 4th century Bishop of Rouen
 Saint Melaine, 6th century Bishop of Rennes
 Mellin (disambiguation)
 Melon (disambiguation)